Shah Baig is a Pakistani politician who is member-elect of the Gilgit Baltistan Assembly.

Political career
Baig contested 2020 Gilgit-Baltistan Assembly election on 15 November 2020 from constituency GBA-15 (Diamer-I) as an Independent candidate. He won the election by the margin of 168 votes over the Independent runner up Muhammad Dilpazir. He garnered 2,685 votes while Dilpazir received 2,517 votes. After winning the election, Manwa joined Pakistan Tehreek-e-Insaf.

References

Living people
Gilgit-Baltistan MLAs 2020–2025
Politicians from Gilgit-Baltistan
Year of birth missing (living people)